Catephia olivacea is a species of moth of the  family Erebidae. It is found on Borneo.

Adults are greenish cinereous, the forewings thinly black-speckled, with black basal, interior and exterior zigzag lines. The reniform spot is incompletely bordered with black and there is a short broad blackish mark near the exterior border towards the tip. The marginal spots are black. The hindwings are brown, but white towards the base.

References

Catephia
Moths described in 1863
Moths of Asia